Prayer for Compassion is an album by David Darling, released through the record label Wind Over the Earth in 2009. In 2010, the album won Darling a Grammy Award for Best New Age Album.

Track listing
All songs by David Darling.

 "Untold Stories", for cello and ambient sounds – 4:49
 "Prayer for Compassion", for cello, chorus and ambient sounds – 4:18
 "Stones Start Spinning", for cello and ambient sounds – 4:15
 "As Long as Grasses Grow and Rivers Run", for cello, flute and ambient sound – 3:44
 "Music of a Desire", for cello and ambient sounds – 2:48
 "Remembering Our Mothers", for cello and ambient sounds – 3:19
 "Beautiful Life", for cello, kalimba and ambient sounds – 2:36
 "War Is Outdated", for cello and ambient sounds – 4:09
 "September Morn", for cello, voice and ambient sounds – 4:35
 "Shoe Strings", for cello and ambient sounds – 2:50
 "Heaven Here on Earth", for cello and ambient sounds – 2:20
 "When We Forgive", for cello and ambient sounds – 4:03

Personnel

 Members of Ars Nova Choir – choir, chorus
 Tom Bates – arranger, editing, mixing, recording
 David Channing – arranger, editing, mixing, recording
 David Darling – cello, piano, voice, composer, liner notes, producer
 Joseph Fire Crow – flute
 Ben Harris – assistant engineer
 Mickey Houlihan – mixing, producer, recording
 Justin Konrad – assistant engineer
 Dominick Maita – mastering
 Samite Mulondo – kalimba
 Adam Olson – assistant engineer
 Tommy Skarupa – assistant engineer
 Michael Verdick – arranger, editing, mixing, recording
 Steve Vidaic – assistant engineer
 Susan Wasinger – art direction, design
 Mike Yach – assistant engineer
 Steve Van Zandt – assistant engineer

References

2009 albums
David Darling (musician) albums
Grammy Award for Best New Age Album